Brenda Schultz-McCarthy was the defending champion, but lost in the quarterfinals to Lisa Raymond.

Raymond went on to win her maiden WTA singles title, defeating Els Callens 6–4, 6–4 in the final.

Seeds

Draw

Finals

Top half

Bottom half

References
Main Draw and Qualifying Draw

Challenge Bell
Tournoi de Québec
Can